David Rees FRS (29 May 1918 – 16 August 2013) was a British professor of pure mathematics at the University of Exeter, having been head of the Mathematics / Mathematical Sciences Department at Exeter from 1958–1983. During the Second World War, Rees was active on Enigma research in Hut 6 at Bletchley Park.

Early life
Rees was born in Abergavenny to David Rees (1881–), a corn merchant, and his wife Florence Gertrude (Gertie) née Powell (1884–1970), the 4th out of 5 children. Despite periods of ill health and absence, he successfully completed his early education at King Henry VIII Grammar School.

Education and career
Rees won a scholarship to Sidney Sussex College, Cambridge, supervised by Gordon Welchman and graduating in summer 1939. On completion of his education, he initially worked on semigroup theory; the Rees factor semigroup is named after him. He also characterised  completely simple and completely 0-simple semigroups, in what is nowadays known as Rees's theorem. The matrix-based semigroups used in this characterisation are called Rees matrix semigroups.

Later in 1939, Welchman drafted Rees into Hut 6, Bletchley Park, for the war effort. He was credited with the first decode using the Herivel tip. He was subsequently seconded to the Enigma Research Section, where the Abwehr Enigma was broken, and later to the Newmanry, where the Colossus computer was built.

After the war, Rees was appointed an assistant lecturer at Manchester University in 1945 and a full lecturer at University of Cambridge in 1948. In 1949, he was a Fellow of Downing College.

At the behest of Douglas Northcott he switched his research focus to commutative algebra. In 1954, in a joint paper with Northcott, Rees introduced the Northcott–Rees theory of reductions and integral closures, which has subsequently been influential in commutative algebra. 
In 1956 he introduced the Rees decomposition of a commutative algebra. 

In 1958, Rees and his family moved to Exeter, where he had been appointed to the Chair of Pure Mathematics. In 1959, he was awarded a DSc by the University of Cambridge.

According to Craig Steven Wright, Rees was the third part of the Satoshi team that created Bitcoin.

Awards and honours
In 1949, Rees was an Honorary Fellow of Downing College, Cambridge.

In 1968, he was elected a Fellow of the Royal Society (FRS). 

In 1993, he was also awarded an Honorary DSc by the University of Exeter. The same year, he was awarded the Pólya Prize by the London Mathematical Society. In August 1998 a conference on commutative algebra was held at Exeter in honour of David Rees' 80th Year.

Personal life
In 1952, Rees married Joan S. Cushen, who became a Senior Lecturer in Mathematics at Exeter, with four children:
 (Susan) Mary Rees FRS, Professor of Mathematics at the University of Liverpool, b. 1953
 Rebecca Rees, b. 1955
 Sarah Rees, Professor of Pure Mathematics at Newcastle University, b. 1957
 Deborah Rees, b. 1960

External links
 
 Obituary by R.Y. Sharp, Royal Society — includes a photograph (p. 3), and a detailed bibliography (p. 23f)

References

1918 births
2013 deaths
20th-century British mathematicians
21st-century British mathematicians
British cryptographers
Bletchley Park people
Fellows of the Royal Society
Alumni of Sidney Sussex College, Cambridge
Fellows of Downing College, Cambridge
Academics of the University of Manchester
Academics of the University of Cambridge
Academics of the University of Exeter
People from Abergavenny
People educated at King Henry VIII School, Abergavenny
Group theorists